Abed Chaudhury (born February 1956) is an Australian-Bangladeshi scientist, author,  and poet living in Australia.

Early life and education

He was born into a Bengali Muslim family known as the Zamindars of Kanihati in Hajipur Union, Kulaura, Moulvibazar District. The family trace their origin to Shah Halim ad-Din Narnauli, a 14th-century Arab missionary who settled in the area. His father was Abdul Mannan (Ibrahim)  Chaudhury and mother was Hafiza Khatun.

Chaudhury was a student at the Moulvibazar Government High School, before proceeding to study at the Notre Dame College of Dhaka. Completing his bachelor's degree in chemistry from Dhaka University, Chaudhury got his PhD from University of Oregon and did post-doctoral research at National Institutes of Health and Massachusetts Institute of Technology in the United States, and was a visiting scientist at École Normale Supérieure in France.

Work in science
Chaudhury is a well-known geneticist and writer in both Bengali and English who together with colleagues in Australia isolated the FIS (fertilization independent seed) genes; fis mutants can produce partial seed without fertilization. These are the first characterised genes involved in apomixis, a method of making seed without the father.  Earlier in USA he did seminal work on gene-targeting and in development of Arabidopsis as a model organism.  He established broad areas of research in Plant Biology by deciphering the genetic pathway of male fertility, seed size, and the role of epigenetics in seed development.

He is currently the Head of Scientific Innovation at LoamBio based in Australia.  Earlier in his career he worked at National Institute of Health of USA, Massachusetts Institute of Technology and Ecole Normale Superieure, CSIRO, Vitagrain and Syngenta.  Chaudhury has established Krishan a new farmer-led innovation platform for increasing biodiversity and generation of climate-compliant crop.  He is an author of numerous scientific publications as well as non-fiction books and several books of poetry in both Bangla and English. 
 leading a group of scientists in Australia in his research.

Chaudhury is currently  living in Australia.

Writing
His first book Shoibal O Ontorikko was an anthology of poems published by Dibya Prokash in 1999.

Books
 Manusher Gene, Gener Manush
 Anuvaber Neelnaksha (Blueprint of Feelings)
 Shoibal O Ontorikko (Poems, published in 1999 by Dibya Prokash)
 Durbashishir O Porbotmala
 Paradigm Shift (Essays, published in 2007 by Shomoy prokashon)
 Nirbachito Kobita by Shucheepatra
 Anguished Rivers and Other Designs by Sucheepatra
 Shopno Sotta Nodi o onnanno Kobita by Boipotro Proshoni

Columns
 Durba Sisir O Porbotmala
 PriyoAustralia online news portal

He has written many articles in several science journals for scientists and in normal papers for general people in Bengali and English.

See also
Zamindars of Kanihati

References

External links
 
 
 Books of Abed Chaudhury
 
 Abed Chaudhury's blog

Bangladeshi male writers
Bengali writers
Bengali-language writers
University of Oregon alumni
Living people
1956 births
People from Kulaura Upazila
Notre Dame College, Dhaka alumni
Bangladeshi people of Arab descent